Tetralobus flabellicornis, the Giant Acacia Click Beetle, is a species of click beetle belonging to the family Elateridae.

Description
This large click beetle has a dark brown body covered with a brownish grey pubescence. The quite long antennae carry large lamellae in males, while they are serrate in females. Larvae live in the termite nests. These beetles feed on Acacia trees.

Distribution and habitat
This species is widespread in South Africa, Namibia, Democratic Republic of Congo, Senegal, Zambia, Zanzibar, Liberia and Zaire. It lives in savannah and subtropical forests.

See also
Oxynopterus mucronatus

References
 Biolib
 in Synopsis of the described Coleoptera of the World
 Mike Picker, Charles Griffiths, Alan Weaving  Field Guide to Insects of South Africa
 Hans G. Schabel  Forest Entomology in East Africa: Forest Insects of Tanzania

Elateridae
Beetles described in 1767
Taxa named by Carl Linnaeus